This is a list of all verifiable organizations that claim to be a Masonic Grand Lodge in Australia and Oceania.

Australia and Oceania

References

See also 
 List of Masonic Grand Lodges

Lists of organizations